Laxton may refer to:

Laxton, East Riding of Yorkshire
Laxton, Northamptonshire
Laxton, Nottinghamshire

Persons with the surname Laxton:
Laxton (surname)